Calvine is a hamlet in Perth and Kinross, Scotland.

It is sandwiched between the A9 road, to its north, and the Highland mainline railway and River Garry, both to its south, and lies just north of Struan and west of Pitagowan. The Falls of Bruar are one mile to the south-west. The former route of the A9, now the B847, runs through the settlement.

The hamlet is known for the Calvine UFO sighting, which occurred nearby, in 1990.

References 

Villages in Perth and Kinross